Caliban is a fictional character appearing in American comic books published by Marvel Comics. He first appeared in The Uncanny X-Men #148 (Aug. 1981), by writer Chris Claremont and artist Dave Cockrum. A mutant with the ability to sense other mutants, he was originally a member of the Morlocks. He was also a member of the X-Factor, X-Men, X-Force and The 198. He was chosen twice by Apocalypse as one of the Horsemen of Apocalypse, first as Death and the second time as Pestilence, and Apocalypse also enhanced his superpowers through genetic manipulation.

The character was portrayed in film by Tómas Lemarquis in X-Men: Apocalypse (2016) and his older version by Stephen Merchant in Logan (2017).

Publication history

Caliban's first appearance was in The Uncanny X-Men #148 (Aug. 1981), written by Chris Claremont and illustrated by Dave Cockrum.

Fictional character biography

He is born an albino mutant with a pale complexion and large yellow eyes. At some point in his life, he is banished from his home by his father, who called him Caliban, after a character from the play The Tempest by William Shakespeare.

Growing up, a still young Caliban, who speaks in the third person, is discovered by the mutant Callisto and taken under her wing. Learning of his mutant tracking ability, Callisto uses Caliban to locate other disenfranchised mutants and organizes them into the Morlocks, a band of homeless, rejected mutants. The founding Morlocks consist of Caliban, Callisto, Masque, Plague, and Sunder. The Morlocks live in the sewers and abandoned subway tunnels running underneath New York City, and, like Caliban, most of them had grotesque appearances.

Caliban senses the presence of nearby mutants and enters a New York City nightclub seeking their friendship. He finds Storm, Dazzler, Kitty Pryde, and the original Spider-Woman in the club, and has a misunderstood confrontation with them. Though the battle ends peacefully, Caliban returns to his home underground.

Shortly thereafter, Morlock leader Callisto desires a consort and has the Morlocks abduct Warren Worthington, the Angel and a member of the X-Men, to be her husband. The X-Men arrive in the sewers to rescue their ally, and Kitty is infected with a virus by Plague. Caliban takes her to his quarters to care for her. Kitty pleads with Caliban to allow her to assist her teammates. Caliban agrees, but only if she will return after the fight and stay with him. Though Kitty promised to stay with him forever, she left and returned home. Weeks later, Callisto, vengeful after losing a one-on-one battle with X-Men leader Storm, orders the Morlocks to kidnap Kitty to force her to marry Caliban, knowing Storm would return. Caliban, however, realized Kitty did not truly love him and released her from her promise. Kitty then became Caliban's friend.

Caliban was later temporarily magically merged with Professor X by Kulan Gath during a confrontation with the sorcerer.

X-Factor
During the Morlock massacre, X-Factor rescued Caliban from the Marauders, and Caliban swore vengeance upon the Marauders. With nowhere else to stay, he took up residence at X-Factor headquarters with several other surviving Morlocks. Soon, he forced Masque to undo damage to the Beast's face, and then returned to the Alley. However, shortly thereafter, Rictor went missing and Caliban volunteered to help X-Factor find him, officially joining the group at that point. Alongside X-Factor, he next battled the Horsemen of Apocalypse. Caliban voiced his wish for increased power, so Iceman began teaching Caliban unarmed combat. He next fought the Right's soldiers and was nearly killed by them; then he aided X-Factor in rescuing the Right's mutant captives.

Horseman of Apocalypse
Not long after that, X-Factor's immortal enemy Apocalypse kidnaps the entire team after changing Angel into Death. Caliban, intrigued by Apocalypse's transformation of the fallen Angel, betrays X-Factor and asks Apocalypse to do the same to him. Agreeing, Apocalypse promises to give Caliban enough power to gain revenge against the Marauders who killed his Morlock family. Caliban agrees to become Apocalypse's servant and locator of mutants. Apocalypse renames him Hellhound. Caliban senses the telepathic cry of Val-Or. Through genetic manipulation, Caliban becomes the second Horseman of Apocalypse known as Death.

When Apocalypse had re-located to the moon in a confrontation with the original X-Factor and the Inhumans, Caliban returns to the Morlock tunnels. There, he locates Sabretooth, a ferocious mutant and member of the Marauders, who is stalking the sewers to find and kill more Morlocks. In combat, Caliban breaks Sabretooth's back and leaves him for dead, not realizing that he has a healing factor. Caliban then attacks and defeats Archangel. He later finds and defeats Sabretooth again.

As Death, Caliban performs various tasks for his new master, serving as his warrior servant. During the X-Cutioner's Song, Caliban attacks former X-Factor members (and current X-Men) Jean Grey and Cyclops, under Apocalypse's (actually Mister Sinister posing as Apocalypse) orders. Alongside War and Famine, Caliban kidnaps Cyclops and Jean Grey so Apocalypse can give the pair to the mad telepath Stryfe, who believes the couple to be his parents. Famine, War, and Death then battle the X-Men and are defeated by them.

X-Force
Eventually, the loner Caliban defeats Apocalypse's control at the cost of his mental faculties. At one point, when Sabretooth is a reluctant X-Men member, the mutant detector kidnaps X-Man Jubilee in exchange for the savage mutant, but he flees when Sabretooth mauls his face.

Though mentally unwell, he retains enormous physical power and is befriended by the mutant Cable. Oddly, Caliban's color shifts from white and monstrous to a semi-friendly Ogre-like form that is purple in coloration. Cable invites Caliban to join his team X-Force. Caliban has many adventures with the team, such as confronting Mojo and his forces, and when Apocalypse's enemy Mister Sinister infiltrates the X-Mansion, Apocalypse's mental leash causes him to savagely maul Sinister. He also has several confrontations with Sabretooth during this time.

Return to Apocalypse
After some time, Apocalypse returns and takes Caliban away from X-Force. This time, Apocalypse makes him his new Horseman Pestilence (coincidentally, the former Pestilence was Caliban's Morlock ally Plague). This time, Apocalypse augments Caliban's physical power even more and gives him the ability to spread telepathic disease as well. This time, Apocalypse's horsemen include Ahab, Deathbird, and Wolverine. After Apocalypse is merged with Cyclops, Caliban tracks down the merged being, and is freed from his service shortly before Cable destroys Apocalypse's spirit.

Released from his servitude to Apocalypse, Caliban once more reverts to his childlike state although he retains the monstrous physique he attained through Apocalypse's machinations.  Subsequently, Caliban is captured by an anti-mutant medical research facility called the Watchtower. The Watchtower wishes to use Caliban for their own purposes but he is freed by X-Force. Caliban has devolved into a feral mental state where he only grunts and snarls but he manages to help X-Force against a menace called the Skornn.

Post M-Day
After M-Day, Caliban turned up at the Xavier institute as a member of the 198. He is seen carrying the 198 banner, created by Erg, during the confrontation with O*N*E* over the "tracking chips" and again during Mr. M's exodus from the institute. He later helps the 198 escape with Domino and Shatterstar to one of Nick Fury's secret bases in the Nevada desert. Caliban was able to sense the stockpile of weapons in the base, but they were activated and locked down by Johnny Dee, a mutant who had puppet-like control over a fraction of the team. The original X-Men team went to collect the 198 but Bishop's pro-registration team stopped them. After a short battle, the two sides teamed up and, thanks to a joint effort by Cyclops and Bishop, were able to free the 198.

Seeking The X-Men
Caliban later aids the Uncanny X-Men team after he is seriously injured by Masque, and crawls his way back to the Xavier Institute. Caliban enters the Morlock Tunnels with Warpath, Storm, and Hepzibah and find what Masque was talking about.

Messiah Complex and Death
Caliban becomes part of a strike-force, who are in search of the first newborn mutant since Decimation, along with Wolverine, Wolfsbane, X-23, Warpath, and Hepzibah (all of whom, except Hepzibah, form the new incarnation of X-Force). During a battle with Lady Deathstrike and the Reavers, Caliban sacrifices himself to save Warpath by jumping into the path of a line of bullets meant for him. His death distracts Warpath making Wolverine the only X-Force member to chase down Cable.

Necrosha
During the Necrosha storyline, Caliban is revived through the Technarch transmode virus by Eli Bard and presented to Selene for the purpose of finding other dead mutants and resurrecting them by the same means, so Bard can sacrifice them and their powers to her. Caliban is later seen next to the grave of long time deceased New Mutants member Cypher and began reviving him. Through him Selene resurrected many deceased mutants, and as she faced X-Force, she digested their powerful life-force energies that would help extend her life.

Dawn of X
Caliban was one amongst many of the fallen mutants revived by The Five on the homeland of Homo Superior called Krakoa, he was shortly gunned down by assailants who invaded Krakoa.

Powers and abilities
Caliban is a mutant with the ability to psionically sense other mutants out to several miles away and track their movements. He also has the uncontrolled ability to psionically sense, absorb, and turn the psionic energy of fear radiated by humans against them, inducing more intense fear within their minds. He could also utilize fear from others to boost his strength to a level sufficient to easily overpower the original Spider Woman (Jessica Drew).

He is a formidable hand-to-hand combatant, having been trained by Iceman and later Apocalypse.

As Death, he attained superhuman strength, speed, agility, reflexes, coordination, balance, endurance, claws and fangs as well as imperviousness to physical injury through Apocalypse's genetic manipulation. He also has great skill at climbing and possesses superhuman leaping ability. He was also mentally conditioned to attack Apocalypse's former ally Mister Sinister on sight. His fear siphoning abilities had also been augmented and he can now control them as well as cast his power over a much wider net; not only gaining in strength from siphoning the anxiety of others but could harness strengthen and redistribute it in much stronger quantities by force of will. This facet of his bolstered power was dubbed the Shadow of Fear by Caliban himself.

As Pestilence, Apocalypse gave him the ability to generate a mental plague, a virus that attacks from within on the highest planes of the psyche and breaks down the mental functions of the target.

Being reverted to his original form by Masque, Caliban still appears to retain some superhuman strength affected by his adrenaline, as he was shown lifting rubble off of Skids that proved difficult for even Warpath to hoist.

After being reanimated through the Technarch transmode virus, his ability changed to psionically sense not living mutants but dead mutants.

Once resurrected after the rise of the new mutant homeland, he resumed his muscular physical appearance he had when he was a horsemen of Apocalypse and before Masque warped his excess flesh away.

Reception
 In 2014, Entertainment Weekly ranked Caliban 89th in their "Let's rank every X-Man ever" list.

Other versions

Age of Apocalypse
In the Age of Apocalypse reality, Caliban was a henchman of the bounty hunter Domino, using his powers to track down Nate Grey. In this incarnation he is an egotistical coward who is nonetheless well-learned in literature and a skilled swordsman.  He is killed by Toad, a member of the Outcasts.

House of M
In the House of M reality, Caliban is seen as a member of the Genoshan Black Ops version of the Marauders.

Ultimate Marvel
Caliban was introduced to the Ultimate Marvel Universe in Ultimate X-Men #82 as a member of the Ultimate Morlocks. His look is somewhat different, as he is now portrayed with a darker grey color instead of chalk white. He is also a stronger physical combatant and has the ability to change into a hulking monster.

X-Factor Forever
Caliban appeared as a henchman and Horseman of Apocalypse.

In other media

Television
 Caliban makes cameo appearances in X-Men: The Animated Series. He also appeared in the final season episode "The Fifth Horseman" in which Caliban had been transformed by Fabian Cortez into one of Apocalypse's Hounds (used in a similar role to the Horsemen), until Jubilee made Caliban turn against Cortez and the rest of the Hounds who sought out a mutant to use as a new host body for Apocalypse's reincarnation. In this episode, Caliban was retconned into a member of the Morlocks, though he had never appeared in the episodes featuring the underground mutant community.
 Caliban appears in X-Men: Evolution, voiced by Michael Dobson. He is seen as a member of the Morlocks.

Film
 Caliban appears in X-Men: Apocalypse, portrayed by Tómas Lemarquis. He works as an underground broker with Psylocke as his bodyguard, until Apocalypse recruits her as one of his Horsemen.
 Caliban appears in Logan portrayed by Stephen Merchant. Before the events of the film, Caliban helped the Transigen Project track down some of the last remaining mutants but left when he saw the horror caused by his actions, and he went into hiding with the very mutants he helped track down. He is recruited by Logan and helps care for Professor X, who is suffering from mental decline. While trying to dump Donald Pierce outside of their shelter, Caliban is held at gunpoint by Pierce and kidnapped by the Reavers. After Logan, Xavier, and Laura escape, Caliban is tortured by Pierce by exposing him to sunlight and severely burning him, forcing him to track the three mutants with his power. Caliban complies but gives them minimal information about where the trio are. When visited by Dr. Zander Rice after the Reavers fail to capture the three, Caliban is manipulated into giving Rice their location by a promise that Logan and Xavier would not be harmed. When Caliban leads them to the Munson farm, he is shocked to see a clone of Logan killing Xavier. Deciding to rebel against his captors and give Logan and Laura a chance to escape, Caliban steals two grenades and sets them off, killing himself and destroying the van he was in. While the Reaver in the van with him was also killed, Pierce survived the explosion. Caliban's charred body is later seen in the Transigen facility, where Rice orders his scientists to extract some of his tissue for future experiments due to his tracking ability and high intellect.

Video games
 Caliban appears in the X-Men: Destiny video game, voiced by Bob Glouberman.

Toys
 Caliban received one action figure in the Toy Biz X-Force toy line. This figure was in his Death persona.
 A Build-A-Figure of Caliban was made for the Hasbro Marvel Legends toy line.

References

External links
 Caliban at Marvel.com
 Uncannyxmen.net spotlight on Caliban
 Uncannyxmen.net feature on the 4 Horsemen of Apocalypse

Characters created by Chris Claremont
Characters created by Dave Cockrum
Comics characters introduced in 1981
Fictional characters with absorption or parasitic abilities
Fictional characters with albinism
Marvel Comics characters who can move at superhuman speeds
Marvel Comics characters who have mental powers
Marvel Comics characters with accelerated healing
Marvel Comics characters with superhuman strength
Marvel Comics film characters
Marvel Comics male superheroes
Marvel Comics male supervillains
Marvel Comics mutants
Wolverine (comics) characters
X-Factor (comics)
X-Men supporting characters